The Southern Maryland Delegation refers to the delegates who are elected from legislative districts in or shared by Calvert, Charles, Prince Georges or St. Mary's Counties to serve in the Maryland House of Delegates.

Authority and responsibilities
The Delegation is responsible for representing the interests, needs and concerns of the citizens of Southern Maryland in the Maryland General Assembly.

Members of the Southern Maryland Delegation

Notes

References

Delegations in the Maryland General Assembly